The 2014–15 Tennessee–Martin Skyhawks men's basketball team represented the University of Tennessee at Martin during the 2014–15 NCAA Division I men's basketball season. The Skyhawks, led by first-year head coach Heath Schroyer, played their home games at Skyhawk Arena and were members of the West Division of the Ohio Valley Conference. They finished the season 21–13, 10–6 in OVC play to finish in second place in the West Division. They lost in the quarterfinals of the OVC tournament to Morehead State. They were invited to the CollegeInsider.com Tournament where they defeated Northwestern State in the first round, USC Upstate in the second round, and Eastern Kentucky in the quarterfinals. In the CIT semifinals, they lost to Evansville.

Previous season 
The Skyhawks finished the 2013–14 season 8–23, 3–13 in OVC play to finish in last place in the West Division and failed to qualify for the OVC tournament. Head coach Jason James was fired at the end of the season.

Roster

Schedule

|-
!colspan=9 style=| Exhibition

|-
!colspan=9 style=| Regular season

|-
!colspan=9 style=| Ohio Valley tournament

|-
!colspan=9 style=| CIT

References

UT Martin Skyhawks men's basketball seasons
Tennessee-Martin
Tennessee-Martin